Donald Young chose to not defend his 2008 title.
Santiago Giraldo won this tournament. He won against Jesse Levine 7–6(4), 6–1 in the final.

Seeds

Draw

Final four

Top half

Bottom half

References
 Main Draw
 Qualifying Draw

Natomas Men's Professional Tennis Tournament - Singles
2009 Singles